A.C.C. Rebergen (born May 29, 1970) is a Dutch civil servant, who has been serving as the Treasurer-General at the Ministry of Finance since 2018.

Education and career 
Rebergen studied general economics at the Vrije Universiteit Amsterdam after receiving his VWO diploma at the Christelijk Streeklyceum in Ede in 1988. Rebergen graduated seven years later and started working at the Ministry of Finance.

Rebergen continued serving there with a hiatus at the House of Representatives until 2002, when he took a job at the Ministry of Foreign Affairs. He served as the interim director of Sustainable Economic Development at the ministry between 2006 and March 2012. Additionally, he served as the Ambassador for the Millennium Development Goals during the last two of those years. Rebergen was subsequently promoted to interim Director-General International Cooperation and became the permanent director-general at the end of 2014.

Rebergen returned to the Finance Ministry in June 2018 to serve as Treasurer-General, succeeding Hans Vijlbrief, who had vacated the position to become president of the Eurogroup Working Group.

Other activities

International organizations 
 Asian Infrastructure Investment Bank (AIIB), Ex-Officio Alternate Member of the Board of Governors (since 2018)
 European Stability Mechanism (ESM), Ex-Officio Member of the Board of Directors (since 2018)
 International Monetary Fund (IMF), Ex-Officio Alternate Member of the Board of Governors (since 2018)

Non-profit organizations 
 PharmAccess Foundation, Member of the Supervisory Board

Personal life 
Rebergen is married and has four children.

References 

1970 births
20th-century Dutch civil servants
21st-century Dutch civil servants
Living people
Vrije Universiteit Amsterdam alumni
Treasurers-General